Latin is an Italic language, originally spoken in ancient Rome and its empire.

Latin may also refer to:

People 
 Latins, the Italic or Romance peoples collectively across various historical periods
 Latins (Italic tribe), an ancient Italic tribe that inhabited central Italy from about 1000 to 300 BC
 Latins (Middle Ages), common name for followers of Western Christianity during the Middle Ages
 Latin Americans, the citizens of the Latin American countries and dependencies
 Latin Europeans, citizens of Latin Europe countries and dependencies

People with the surname 
 Denis Latin (born 1966), a Croatian television host
 Ivo Latin (1929–2002), former speaker of the Parliament of Croatia and Mayor of Zagreb

Language 
 Latin languages or Romance languages, modern languages that evolved from Vulgar Latin
 Latin alphabet, writing system used by the ancient Romans
 Latin script, writing system used for most contemporary European languages
 Archaic Latin, Latin language before 75 BC
 Classical Latin, literary Latin language of the late Roman Republic and early Roman Empire
 Late Latin, written Latin of late antiquity
 Vulgar Latin, non-standard Latin language variety spoken by the people of Ancient Rome
 Medieval Latin, Latin language of the Medieval era
 Renaissance Latin, Latin language of the Renaissance era
 New Latin, revival of the Latin language between c. 1375 and c. 1900
 Contemporary Latin, the form of the Latin language used since the end of the 19th century

Music 
 Latin music, a popular music genre
 Latin (George Dalaras album), 1987
 Latin (Holy Fuck album), an album by the band Holy Fuck
 "Latin", the fourth movement of Mike Oldfield's Tubular Bells 2003 album

Other uses 
 , a village in Plaški, Croatia
 LATIN, a Latin American newspaper association
 Latin Church, the portion of the Catholic Church employing the Latin liturgical rites

See also 
 Latin Quarter (disambiguation)
 Latina (disambiguation)
 Latino (disambiguation)
 Latinization (disambiguation)
 Ladin (disambiguation)
 Lattin (disambiguation)
 Latin America, a group of countries and dependencies in the Western Hemisphere
 Latinus, a figure in Greek and Roman mythology associated with Odysseus and Aeneas
 Lateen or latin-rig, a type of sail rigging